Best of Tests DS is an educational video game released for Nintendo DS in North America on March 4, 2008.  The game intends to present tests and puzzles that will help stimulate one's Intelligent Quotient or "IQ" through five categories: logic, observation, memory, speed of perception and analysis. The game contains three gaming modes: Training, Memory and Tests. Best of Tests DS calculates the player's IQ and adapts the difficulty level in order to provide a personalized challenge that is always renewed and updated.

Reception

Best of Tests DS received negative reviews from critics upon release. On Metacritic, the game holds a score of 32/100 based on 8 reviews, indicating "generally unfavorable reviews."

References

External links
 GameSpot Summary

2008 video games
Nintendo DS games
Nintendo DS-only games
Brain training video games
Puzzle video games
Video games developed in France
Multiplayer and single-player video games
Neko Entertainment games
Conspiracy Entertainment games